Kim Myeong-soo (born 12 October 1959) is a South Korean jurist and the 16th Chief Justice of the Supreme Court of Korea, inaugurated on 25 September 2017, succeeding the outgoing Yang Sung-tae.

Biography
Kim graduated from the Seoul National University School of Law in 1981, and passed the National Judicial Examination in 1983. He began his career at the Northern Branch Court of Seoul District Court in 1986. In February 2016, he was assigned as the Chief Judge of Chuncheon District. He began his 6-year term as Chief Justice on 25 September 2017, after being elected in a 160–134 vote of parliamentary approval.

References

1959 births
Living people
South Korean judges
Chief justices of the Supreme Court of Korea
Seoul National University School of Law alumni